Puckle is a surname. Notable people with the surname include:

Giles Puckle (born 1979), English cricketer
James Puckle (1667–1724), English inventor, lawyer, and writer
Puckle gun, a flintlock revolver

See also
Pückler